Spouter Peak is a conspicuous rock peak, standing in eastern Voden Heights  south-southwest of Daggoo Peak at the south side of the mouth of Flask Glacier, on the east coast of Graham Land, a portion of the Antarctic Peninsula. Surveyed and partially photographed by the Falkland Islands Dependencies Survey (FIDS) in 1947. Named by the United Kingdom Antarctic Place-Names Committee (UK-APC) in 1956 after the Spouter Inn, New Bedford, where Herman Melville's story Moby-Dick opens.

External links 

 Spouter Peak on USGS website
 Spouter Peak on AADC website
 Spouter Peak on SCAR website
 Spouter Peak area map
 Spouter Peak on peakery.com

References 

Mountains of Graham Land
Oscar II Coast